Alex Chandon (born 3 November 1968 in North London) is a film director, writer and digital artist.

Biography

Directing career
His early films, Drillbit and Bad Karma, featured many musicians from the UK anarcho punk scene, notably Ben Bethell, Dan MacCintyre, William 'Bill' Corbett from The Apostles and Julian Portinari from Pallor.

Cradle of Fear
His highest-profile release to date is Cradle of Fear, starring Dani Filth in a leading role, and other members of Cradle of Filth in cameo appearances.

Borderline
Chandon was once known primarily for specialising in straight-to-video micro-budget horror films, but his latest projects, especially Borderline (2006), featuring music by The Dark Poets, show a more mature side to his work. Borderline has now been chosen for the British Film Institute's National Archive.

Inbred
Chandon directed the £1,000,000 project Inbred, which was shot in July 2010 in the market town of Thirsk. The script for the black comedy horror film was co-written by Paul Shrimpton.

Teleportal
Chandon's short Teleportal, the script for which was adapted from Paul Shrimpton, was made into a short film. The short premiered on 16 September 2009 and was released as segment of the anthology film Zombieworld in February 2015 on DVD.

Music videos
Chandon's relationship with Cradle of Filth has also produced music videos for the songs "From the Cradle to Enslave", "No Time to Cry" and "Her Ghost in the Fog", as well as documentaries on their DVDs PanDaemonAeon and Heavy, Left-handed and Candid.

Filmography

Music videos

References

External links

1968 births
British film directors
Living people
British male actors
Male actors from London
British male screenwriters
British film editors
Horror film directors